Basal is a village in Jand Tehsil of Attock district in the Punjab Province of Pakistan.

The village is prominent for having stations of Pakistan Railways. Two small stations Basal Sharif and Sulemanabad and one is Basal Junction.

History
Basal village is on the name of "baba basa" which locals said.

Education
There are several schools and colleges in Basal, including Government Degree College Basal ,Fauji Foundation College Basal, Spirit School Basal, and Oxford Girls Science College Basal..

References

Villages in Attock District